The black-headed spider monkey (Ateles fusciceps) is a type of New World monkey, from Central and South America. It is found in Colombia, Ecuador, and Panama. Although primatologists such as Colin Groves (1989) follow Kellogg and Goldman (1944) in treating A. fusciceps as a separate species, other authors, including Froelich (1991), Collins and Dubach (2001) and Nieves (2005) treat it as a subspecies of Geoffroy's spider monkey.

The two subspecies are:

Ateles fusciceps fusciceps - northwestern Ecuador.
Ateles fusciceps rufiventris - southwest Colombia to eastern Panama.

Habitat 
It lives in population densities of 1.2 monkeys per square kilometer.

Description 
A. f. fusciceps has a black or brown body and a brown head. A. f. rufiventris is entirely black with some white on its chin. The black-headed spider monkey is one of the larger New World monkeys. On average, males weigh  and females weigh . Its brain weighs .

Diet 
The Black spider monkey is primarily frugivorous, with the consumption of fruit consisting of about 80% of their diet. the remainder of its diet is omnivorous and consists of leaves, nuts, seeds, bark, insects, and flowers.

Behavior 
The black-headed spider monkey is arboreal and diurnal. The species is highly sociable, living in social groups with up to 20 individuals but travels in smaller groupings. Most travel is done by brachiating and climbing through woodland areas.

Reproduction 
When mating, females may consort with a male for up to three days, or else mate with several males. Mating occurs with the male and female face to face, and can last for five to 10 minutes. The gestation period is between 226 and 232 days. The infant rides on its mother's back for 16 weeks, and is weaned at 20 months. Females attain sexual maturity at 51 months; males at 56 months. Females give birth every three years.

The black-headed spider monkey is considered to be endangered by the International Union for Conservation of Nature (IUCN) due to an estimated population loss of more than 50% over 45 years (2018-2063), from hunting and human encroachment on its range of habitation.

Captive black-headed spider monkeys have been known to live more than 24 years.

Gallery

References

black-headed spider monkey
Primates of Central America
Mammals of Colombia
Mammals of Ecuador
Primates of South America
Critically endangered fauna of North America
Critically endangered biota of South America
black-headed spider monkey
black-headed spider monkey